Chapel Hill is a historic home located near Mint Spring, Augusta County, Virginia. It was built about 1834, and is a two-story, three bay, brick I-house dwelling in the Federal style. The front facade features a central pedimented pavilion with an elliptical fanlight over the doorway and another in the pediment.  The interior features French scenic wallpaper, woodgraining and marbleizing. Also on the property are the contributing frame office with some Gothic details, a pyramidal-roofed frame smokehouse, and a gable-roofed dairy.

It was listed on the National Register of Historic Places in 1978.

References

Houses on the National Register of Historic Places in Virginia
Federal architecture in Virginia
Houses completed in 1834
Houses in Augusta County, Virginia
National Register of Historic Places in Augusta County, Virginia
1834 establishments in Virginia